Elmutasem Abushnaf also known as Elmotassem Aboshnaf (born 14 November 1991) is a Libyan footballer who plays as a forward for Rapide Oued Zem.

International career

International goals
Scores and results list Libya's goal tally first.

Honours 
Libya
 African Nations Championship: 2014

References

External links 
 

1991 births
Living people
Libyan footballers
Libya international footballers
Association football forwards
ES Zarzis players
Al-Ittihad Club (Tripoli) players
Al-Madina SC players
Tunisian Ligue Professionnelle 1 players
Botola players
Libyan expatriate footballers
Libyan expatriate sportspeople in Tunisia
Libyan expatriate sportspeople in Morocco
Expatriate footballers in Tunisia
Expatriate footballers in Morocco
People from Tripoli, Libya
Libyan Premier League players
Libya A' international footballers
2014 African Nations Championship players
2018 African Nations Championship players